Assieu is a commune in the Isère department in the Auvergne-Rhône-Alpes region of south-eastern France.

The inhabitants of the commune are known as Assieutois or Assieutoises.

Geography
Assieu is located some 30 km south by south-east of Givors and 8 km east by north-east of Saint-Maurice-l'Exil. Access to the commune is by the D131 road from the D134 in the south passing north then east in the commune to the town then north and continuing north-west to Route nationale 7. Apart from the town there is the village of La Charinaz in the east and Les Bruyeres in the west. The commune has large forests in the east as well as one in the west with significant residential areas and the rest of the land farmland.

The Vareze river forms the northern border and gathers many tributaries rising in the commune as it flows west to join the Rhône at Saint-Alban-du-Rhône.

Neighbouring communes and villages

Heraldry

Administration

List of Successive Mayors

Demography
In 2017 the commune had 1,472 inhabitants.

Sites and monuments

Chateau Juveneton
Chateau Richoux
Church from the 19th century

See also
Communes of the Isère department

References

External links
Assieu on the old IGN website 
Assieu on Géoportail, National Geographic Institute (IGN) website 
Aßien on the 1750 Cassini Map

Communes of Isère
Dauphiné